Markusson is a surname. Notable people with the surname include:

Johan Markusson (born 1979), Swedish ice hockey player
Kjersti Markusson (born 1955), Norwegian politician

Surnames of Scandinavian origin